Wyckoff Glacier is a glacier, 6 nautical miles (11 km) long, flowing west from Grindley Plateau in Queen Alexandra Range, just north of Lamping Peak. Named by Advisory Committee on Antarctic Names (US-ACAN) for Kent A. Wyckoff, United States Antarctic Research Program (USARP) meteorologist at Hallett Station, 1963.

Glaciers of the Ross Dependency
Shackleton Coast